Gail Johnson (later Buzonas; born 1954) is an American synchronized swimming competitor who won four gold medals at the world championships in 1973 and 1975. After retiring from competition she had a long career as a national synchronized swimming coach. In 1983, she was inducted into the International Swimming Hall of Fame.

See also
 List of members of the International Swimming Hall of Fame

References

1954 births
Living people
American synchronized swimmers
Place of birth missing (living people)
Pan American Games gold medalists for the United States
Pan American Games medalists in synchronized swimming
Synchronized swimmers at the 1975 Pan American Games
World Aquatics Championships medalists in synchronised swimming
Medalists at the 1975 Pan American Games
20th-century American women